is a Japanese voice actress from Saitama, Saitama Prefecture, Japan. She was affiliated with Mausu Promotion until 2014.

Filmography

Anime
2006
 Fighting Beauty Wulong (Rika)
 Muteki Kanban Musume (Chiemi)
2007
 Emma: A Victorian Romance Second Act (Francis, Ida, Williams Jones (young))
 Heroic Age (Hestia)
 Tokyo Majin (Sera Rikudō)
2008
 Itazura na Kiss (Akiko Nagasawa, Ayako Matsumoto, Pūta)
 Kanokon (Yūki Sasamori)
 Net Ghost PiPoPa (Yūko Akikawa, Chizuru Honjō)
 Nodame Cantabile: Paris (Celine)
2009
 Canaan (Chiaki Iso)
 Fresh Pretty Cure! (Reika)
 Yumeiro Patissiere (Kyōko Amano)
2010
 Fairy Tail (Evergreen)
 Kekkaishi (Kyoko)
 Strike Witches 2 (Mio Sakamoto)
 Yumeiro Patissiere SP Professional (Kyōko Amano)
2011
 Infinite Stratos (Kaoruko Mayuzumi)
2012
 High School DxD (Grayfia Lucifuge)
2013
 Tanken Driland (Cherry)
 High School DxD New (Grayfia Lucifuge)
 Infinite Stratos 2 (Kaoruko Mayuzumi)
 Photo Kano (Misa Kitagawa)
2014
 Girl Friend Beta (Tatsuru Iwamoto)
2015
 Fafner in the Azure: EXODUS (Mai Dōma)
 High School DxD BorN (Grayfia Lucifuge)
2019
Strike Witches 501st Unit, Taking Off! (Mio Sakamoto)

OVA
 Fairy Tail (Evergreen)
 High School DxD (Grayfia Lucifuge)
 Kanokon: The Great Midsummer Carnival (Yūki Sasamori)
 Strike Witches: Operation Victory Arrow (Mio Sakamoto)
 Final Fantasy XV: Episode Ardyn Prologue (Aera Mils Fleuret)

Theatrical animation
 Fairy Tail the Movie: The Phoenix Priestess (Evergreen)
 Strike Witches (Mio Sakamoto)

Video games
2006
 Izuna: Legend of the Unemployed Ninja (Izuna)
2007
 Izuna 2: The Unemployed Ninja Returns (Izuna)
2008
 Kane & Lynch: Dead Men (Yoko)
 Majin Tantei Nōgami Neuro: Neuro to Yako no Bishoku Sanmai Suiritsuki Gourmet and Mystery (Yukiko Nakata)
 Tom Clancy's Rainbow Six: Vegas 2 (Shalon Judd)
2010
 Ace Combat: Joint Assault (Sarah Anderson)
2011
 Uncharted: Golden Abyss (Marisa Chase)
 Catherine (Lindsay Uspenski)
2012
 Resident Evil: Revelations (Rachel Foley)
 Fire Emblem Awakening (Severa, Anna)
 Photo Kano (Misa Kitagawa)
2014
 Girl Friend Beta (Tatsuru Iwamoto)
 Hyrule Warriors (Princess Zelda, Sheik)
 Until Dawn (Hannah Washington, Beth Washington)
2015
 Fire Emblem Fates (Selena, Anna)
 Until Dawn (Beth, Hannah)
 Fallout 4 (Piper Wright)
2016
 Hyrule Warriors Legends (Princess Zelda, Sheik)
2017
 Fire Emblem Heroes (Anna, Severa)
2019
 Final Fantasy XV: Episode Ardyn (Aera Mils Fleuret)
 Starlink: Battle for Atlas (Razor Lemay)
 Catherine: Full Body (Lindsay Uspenski)
 Fire Emblem: Three Houses (Anna)
2023
 Fire Emblem Engage (Anna)

Dubbing

Live-action
 24 (Evelyn Martin, Nicole)
 48 Hrs. (Elaine Marshall)
 Aliens in the Attic (Bethany Pearson (Ashley Tisdale))
 Ballet Shoes (Petrova Fossil) 
 Bones (Alyssa Howland)
 Butterfly on a Wheel (Sophie) 
 Camp Rock (Mitchie Torres)
 Camp Rock 2: The Final Jam (Mitchie Torres)
 Disaster Movie (The Beautiful Assassin)
 Eagle Eye (Becky)
 The Final Destination (Janet Cunningham (Haley Webb))
 Flight 7500 (Liz Lewis)
 The Flock (Harriet Wells)
 Frankenstein (William Frankenstein)
 Gilmore Girls (Louise Grant)
 Grown Ups 2 (Roxanne Feder (Salma Hayek))
 The Grudge 2 (Lacey)
 Heroes (Monica Dawson)
 Hobo with a Shotgun (Abby)
 I, Frankenstein (Terra Wade)
 The Illusionist (Duchess Sophie von Teschen)
 The Keeper (Nikita Wells)
 Kidnap and Ransom (Florence Holland)
 Lightspeed (Beth Baker)
 Medium (Mandy Sutton)
 Murdoch Mysteries (Dr. Julia Ogden) 
 Numb3rs (Megan Reeves)
 Once Upon a Time (Ariel)
 Partners in Crime (Prudence "Tuppence" Beresford)
 Perfume: The Story of a Murderer (Laura Richis)
 Princess Protection Program (Princess Rosalinda/Rosie Gonzalez)
 Private Practice (Maya Bennett)
 Resurrection (Dr. Maggie Langston)
 The Returned (Rowan Blackshaw)
 Savages (Ophelia "O" Sage)
 Slayer (Dr. Laurie Williams)
 Sonny with a Chance (Allison "Sonny" Munroe)
 Step Brothers (Pam Gringe)
 Suits (Rachel Zane)
 Vantage Point (Grace Riggs)
 Warrior (Tess Conlon (Jennifer Morrison))
 Whitechapel (Lizzie Pepper)

Animation
 The Spectacular Spider-Man (Mary Jane Watson)
 X-Men (Jubilee)

References

External links
 
 Official blog
 

1982 births
Living people
Japanese video game actresses
Japanese voice actresses
Voice actresses from Saitama (city)
21st-century Japanese actresses
Mausu Promotion voice actors